The Municipal Stadium is a multi-purpose stadium in Sfântu Gheorghe, Romania. It is used mostly for football matches and is the home ground of Sepsi OSK. The stadium holds 5,200 people.

References

Football venues in Romania
Buildings and structures in Covasna County